, also known as Jirō (次郎) or by his court title, Yamato no Kami (大和守), was a Japanese samurai of the Sengoku period through early Edo period. He served the Date clan of Sendai han during the tenure of its lord Masamune. Akimitsu was born in 1550, the fourth son of Date Harumune. His siblings included Rusu Masakage and Date Terumune, Masamune's father. After the destruction of the Ashina clan in Tenshō 17 (1589), he came under Masamune's command. In Masamune's service, Akimitsu was acknowledged as chief among the heads of the Date clan's cadet branches, or ichimon-hittō (一門衆筆頭). He served in the Korean campaign, as well as the Osaka campaign.

In 1598, Akimitsu was entrusted with Kakuda Castle, which came with a stipend of 10,000 koku.

References

1550 births
1622 deaths
Samurai